FOXC2 antisense RNA 1 is a protein that in humans is encoded by the FOXC2-AS1 gene.

References

Further reading 

Genes
Human proteins